The tables below show the current makeup of the Saudi Arabian Football League system. The Saudi Professional League sits at the top of the pyramid and currently two teams get promoted/relegated between the Professional League and the First Division League.

There is also a Second Division League which currently features two groups of sixteen teams were clubs are promoted between this level and the First Division.

SAFF announcement a newly created fourth division officially named is Third Division League from 2021, the league features four groups of eight teams were clubs are promoted between this level and the Second Division.

Overview

Locations of the teams

Current Professional League Teams

Current First Division Teams

Current Second Division Teams

References

External links 
 Saudi Arabia Football Federation at FIFA.com Arabic - English Site
 Saudi Arabia Professional League on Super.com Arabic Site
 Saudi Professional League Commission  Arabic Site

 
Saudi Arabia